Different political parties in Manipur state of India are:

Major national parties
 Bharatiya Janata Party (BJP)
 Indian National Congress (INC)
 National People's Party (NPP)
 Communist Party of India (CPI)

Minor national-level parties

 Nationalist Congress Party (NCP)
 All India Trinamool Congress (AITC)
 Lok Janshakti Party (LJP)
 Janata Dal (United) (JDU) 
 Samata Party (SAP)
 Janata Dal (Secular) (JDS)
 Rashtriya Janata Dal (RJD)
 Samajwadi Party (SP)
 Communist Party of India (Marxist) (CPM)
 Revolutionary Socialist Party (RSP)
 All India Forward Bloc (AIFB)
 Aam Aadmi Party (AAP)
 Shiv Sena
 Bahujan Samaj Party (BSP)
 Republican Party of India (A) (RPIA)

Regional parties
 Manipur Peoples Party (MPP)
 People's Democratic Alliance (PDA)
 Meeyamgi Thougalloi Manipur (MTM) of Chungkham Joyraj
 Manipur National Democratic Front (MNDF) of Ch. Priyokumar, Bijoy Koijam and K. Khagendra Singh
 Manipur Democratic People's Front (MDPF) of Dr Gurumayum Tonsana Sharma
 Manipur Peoples Conference (MPC) of  B. Govind Sharma 
 Peoples’ Resurgence and Justice Alliance (PRAJA)
 North East India Development Party (NEIDP)
 Naga People's Front (NPF)
 Naga National Party (NNP)
 Kuki National Assembly (KNA)

Note:  There is a proposal to merge People's Democratic Alliance, Meeyamgi Thougalloi Manipur, Manipur National Democratic Front, Manipur Democratic People's Front, and Manipur Peoples Conference with Manipur Peoples Party.

Defunct regional parties
 Manipur United Front (MUF)
 Manipur Hill People's Council (MHPC)
 Manipur Hills Union (MHU)
 United Naga Integration Council (UNIC) {merged with Congress}
 Democratic People's Party (DPP)
 Manipur Nationalist Congress {merged with Congress}
 Janata Dal (Loken) {merged with Congress}
 Progressive Federal Party of Manipur {merged with BJP}
 Manipur Regional Congress Party (MRCP) of Radhabinod Koijam {merged with Samata Party}
 Democratic Revolutionary Peoples Party (DRPP) of N. Biren Singh {merged with Congress}
 Manipur National Conference (MNC) of Wahengbam Nipamacha Singh {merged with RJD}
 Manipur State Congress Party (Progressive) (MSCP-P) of Wahengbam Nipamacha Singh {merged with BJP}
 Manipur State Congress Party (Chaoba) (MSCP-C) of Thounaojam Chaoba Singh {merged with BJP}
 Manipur State Congress Party (Mani) (MSCP-M) of Yumnam Mani Singh {merged with Congress}
 Federal Party of Manipur (FPM) of Gangmumei Kamei {merged with Manipur Peoples Party}

References

 
parties
Lists of political parties in India
Manipur-related lists